Tolonidine is an antihypertensive.

See also 
 Clonidine

References

Alpha-2 adrenergic receptor agonists
Antihypertensive agents
Chloroarenes
Imidazolines